Smoleva is a village in the Municipality of Železniki in the Upper Carniola region of Slovenia. It lies in the valley of Lower Smoleva Creek between Špik Hill to the northeast and Mount Vancovec to the southwest.

References

External links
Smoleva at Geopedia

Populated places in the Municipality of Železniki